SS Howard A. Kelly was an American Liberty ship built in 1943 for service in World War II. Her namesake was Howard Atwood Kelly, an influential American architect of collegiate and ecclesiastical buildings.

Design 

Most Liberty ships were named after prominent deceased Americans.

Construction and career 
This particular ship was built by Bethlehem Shipbuilding Corporation in Baltimore. She was launched on 18 March 1943 and commissioned later that year. She was operated as a  Merchant navy ship for the United States Shipping Board by A. L. Burbank & Company, Ltd.

She was scrapped in 1969.

References

 

Liberty ships
Ships built in Maryland
1943 ships